J. Don Thorson (born April 30, 1933) was an American politician in the state of Wyoming. He served in the Wyoming House of Representatives as a member of the Republican Party. He attended the Colorado School of Mines and is an oil producer.

References

1933 births
Living people
People from Weston County, Wyoming
Colorado School of Mines alumni
Ranchers from Wyoming
Republican Party members of the Wyoming House of Representatives